Zgornji Velovlek is a settlement in the Municipality of Destrnik in northeastern Slovenia. The area is part of the traditional region of Styria. The municipality is now included in the Drava Statistical Region.

There is a small chapel-shrine with a wooden belfry on the regional road from Ptuj to Lenart v Slovenskih Goricah in the settlement. It dates to the early 20th century.

There are a number of Roman-period burial mounds in the area of the settlement.

References

External links
Zgornji Velovlek at Geopedia

Populated places in the Municipality of Destrnik